The 2022 New Jersey Generals season was the  first season for the New Jersey Generals as a professional American football franchise. They played as charter members of the United States Football League, one of eight teams to compete in the league for the 2022 season. The Generals technically play as a traveling team (since the entirety of the regular season will be played at Protective Stadium and Legion Field in Birmingham, Alabama) and were led by head coach Mike Riley.

Personnel

Final roster

The Generals, like all other teams, have a 38-man active roster with a 7-man practice squad.

Staff

Schedule

Regular season
The Generals' 2022 schedule was announced on March 7. They opened the season against the Birmingham StallionsTotal: 9–1 Home: 5–0 Away: 4–1

Note: Intra-division opponents are in bold text. * mean that they host the game, since all eight teams play at the same stadium

Game summaries

Week 1: at Birmingham Stallions

The Generals started their first season in the inaugural opener for the USFL against the Stallions. The first pass went for 49 yards to Randy Satterfield. The first score came on a Satterfield reception from Luis Perez, putting the Generals up 7–0. The Stallions answered with a 35-yard touchdown pass to Osirus Mitchell to tie the game 7–7. The rest of the quarter saw the teams trade punts. The Generals scored the only points of the 2nd quarter with a touchdown after an Alex McGough interception, putting the Generals up 14–7. Kicker Nick Rose also missed a 47-yard field goal that would've put the Generals up 17–7. On their first drive of the second half, the Generals drove 75 yards down field and set up a 22-yard field goal for Rose which he missed. The Stallions then scored with a C. J. Marable 3-yard rush, tying the game 14–14.  In the fourth quarter, the Generals drove 65 yards for a touchdown putting them up 21–14. The Stallions would respond with a 6 play 67-yard touchdown, tying it up again at 21–21. The Generals responded with a 38-yard field goal drive, ending in a 47-yard field goal, putting the Generals at 24–21 with 1:54 remaining. However, the Stallions would respond by driving 59 yards downfield for a touchdown that would give them their first lead at 28–24, which would be the final score.

Week 2: vs. Michigan Panthers

The Generals played against their division rival Michigan Panthers to open Week 2. The Generals struck first on a 21-yard field goal to put the Generals up 3–0 to score the only points of the first. In the second quarter, Panthers safety Orion Stewart intercepted Luis Perez and brought it back to the Generals 20 yard line. The Panthers capitalized, scoring a touchdown three plays later, putting the Generals down 3–6. After trading punts, the Generals drove downfield that was capped off by a Darius Victor 1 yard rush, putting the Generals up 10–6.

The Panthers received the ball to start the second half. They drove downfield on a 15 play, 53 yard drive that ate up more than half the third quarter. On the Generals 21 yard line, the Panthers attempted a 39-yard field goal, but it was missed. In the fourth quarter, the Generals had a chance to go up 13–6, but they also missed a 34-yard field goal. Both teams failed to score in the fourth quarter, ending up in a 10–6 Generals win, rising to 1–1.

Week 3: at Philadelphia Stars

The Generals took on division rival Philadelphia Stars in a game in which the winner would gain 1st in the North Division. With 11:23 left in the 1st quarter, Stars quarterback Bryan Scott completed a 41-yard touchdown pass to tight end Bug Howard. On the final drive of the first quarter. In the 2nd quarter, the Stars drove into the red zone, but only came away with 3 points on a Matt Mengel 22-yard field goal, extending their lead to 10–0. The Generals would drive the game to a 1 possession game before half, connecting on a 54-yard field goal by kicker Nick Rose. The Stars would lead 10–3 at halftime.

On the first drive of the second half, the Generals would tie the game at 10 on a 4-yard Darius Victor rushing touchdown. But on the next drive, the Stars would take the lead on a 6-yard pass from quarterback Case Cookus to wide receiver Diondre Overton. The 4th quarter would be all New Jersey, as they would get 14 unanswered points. A 1-yard Darius Victor run, and a 4-yard De'Andre Johnson run. The win put the Generals in sole possession of first place in the North Division.

Standings

Postseason

References

New Jersey
2022 in sports in New Jersey
New Jersey Generals (2022)